Mohamed Coulibaly (born September 19, 1989) is a Malian swimmer, who specialized in sprint freestyle events. He represented Mali at the 2008 Summer Olympics in Beijing, and competed in the men's 50 m freestyle event. Coulibaly swam in the third heat of the competition, with a time of 29.09 seconds, finishing in fifth place, and eighty-sixth in the overall standings.

References

External links
NBC Olympics Profile

1989 births
Living people
Malian male swimmers
Olympic swimmers of Mali
Swimmers at the 2008 Summer Olympics
21st-century Malian people